The Flight Before Christmas (aka Niko & The Way to the Stars) is a 2008 computer animated Christmas film directed by Michael Hegner and Kari Juusonen. It revolves around a young reindeer named Niko who must overcome his fear of flying by heading to Santa Claus' fell to save him and his fleet of flying reindeer from a pack of wolves. The film was a Finnish production with co-producers in Denmark, Germany and Ireland. It was produced by Anima Vitae, Animaker Oy, A. Film A/S, Ulysses Films, and Magma Films. The animation was produced in Finland, Germany and Denmark, with post-production carried out in Ireland. A 45-minute television edit in American English, was produced in the United States for CBS under the title The Flight Before Christmas. A sequel, Little Brother, Big Trouble: A Christmas Adventure was released in October 2012 in Finland. It is one of the most expensive Finnish films.

Plot
Niko, a young reindeer, is told by Oona, his mother, that his father is one of the "Flying Forces", Santa's flying reindeer. For years, Niko has dreamed of joining his father in the Flying Forces, but he himself is unable to fly and even has a fear of heights. While trying to fly with the encouragement of Julius, a flying squirrel, the other young reindeer teased Niko. To avoid further teasing, Niko and his friend Saga leave their protected valley so Niko can practice without any disruptions. However, they are spotted by wolves and flee back to the herd in panic, but wind up luring the wolf pack to the valley. As the herd flees, Saga's father, the herd's leader battles and defeats a wolf, but is wounded in the process. Later, Niko overhears others talking of how his actions have damaged the herd, and decides to leave the herd in an attempt to find his father and Santa's Fell.

When Niko is discovered missing, Julius chooses to look for Niko, since he can search without leaving a trail as fresh snow is falling. Once he finds him, Julius is unable to convince Niko to return to the herd, and reluctantly joins him in the search for Santa's secret location. Meanwhile, Essie, a lost pet poodle, stumbles upon the wolf pack and is about to be eaten, but suggests to Black Wolf, the alpha wolf, the idea of killing Santa's reindeer. Essie is considered Black Wolf's good luck charm for this idea and is spared, but is also forced to join the pack. Niko and Julius discover Wilma, a weasel, stuck in a small tree branch and rescue her. She reluctantly joins Niko and Julius, believing she is indebted to them. Julius and Niko later get separated in a sudden blizzard and Niko wakes up under a pile of snow, unnoticed by the nearby wolf pack. Niko overhears Black Wolf resolving to kill Santa as well and take his place so he could also eat children.

When Niko is discovered, he flees and finds Julius, but the two are cornered between rock cliffs. Wilma saves them by triggering an avalanche with her singing, then guides Niko and Julius to safety. She then continues to follow them, since she knows the way to Santa's home due to having previously worked there as a singer. Eventually, Niko tries to cross a dangerous river by flying with Wilma's help, but fails and falls once he looks down. Thinking they are dead, the wolves head for Santa's home. At the same time, Julius and Wilma save Niko from going over a high waterfall.

While waiting for Niko to recover, Julius recounts how his real family was taken by wolves, and says that he has viewed Niko like a son now. Once they arrive at Santa's place, Niko is almost hit by the Flying Forces while standing on the runway. Niko tells them of Black Wolf's plan, but they doubt a wolf would discover Santa's secret valley. As they celebrate at their bar before heading out on Christmas Eve, Wilma sings them a song that asks them the identity of Niko's father. None of the reindeer respond, but they decide to do a "flying test" to see if Niko has the genetics to fly and thus prove if his claim is true. Upon realizing the potential danger of this, Julius yells at Niko while he is in midflight, so he falls again but is saved by Dasher. After this, the wolves find their way into the valley and the scared reindeer lose their power of flight. Black Wolf chooses to pursue Niko and corners him up a tall tree.

Meanwhile, as the other reindeer are cornered on the runway by the other wolves, Julius convinces the reindeer that they can fly, allowing them to save Niko using the sleigh. Black Wolf latches onto the sleigh, but Julius dislodges the part he is holding on to. In order to save Julius from falling as well, Niko jumps off the sleigh, only to realize that he can finally fly, and successfully saves Julius as Black Wolf falls to his seeming death. Niko, backed up by the Flying Forces, send the wolves fleeing when they realize Black Wolf's defeat. Prancer, congratulating Niko on his bravery, reveals that he is his father. Afterwards, Niko meets Santa, who invites him to join the Flying Forces. However, after Julius leaves to update Niko's mother and the herd on his well-being, Niko chooses to stay with his mother and Julius, but intends to visit Prancer. Niko and Julius then take the herd to a new valley.

Production
The animation took place in three countries; initial animation production and effects were produced in Finland, Germany and Denmark. Rendering and Lighting took place in Finland, and much of the post-production was carried out in Ireland. The American version of the film re-casts Norm Macdonald as Julius and Emma Roberts as Wilma.

English cast
 Andrew McMahon as Niko, a young reindeer who wishes to fly
 Morgan Jones as Julius, a flying squirrel
 Alan Stanford as Black Wolf
 Susan Zelouf as Essie, a poodle
 Aileen Mythen as Wilma, a stoat
 Gavin Morgan as Smiley
 Carly Baker as Saga
 Paul Tylak as Prancer, one of Santa's flying forces and the father of Niko, and Specs
 Patrick Fitzsymons as Leader and Grandpa
 Morgan Jones, Paul Tylak and Patrick Fitzsymons as Santa's Flying Forces
 Susan Slott as Oona, the mother of Niko
 Frank Welker as Lockdown, the transformer character

Reception
The Flight Before Christmas currently only has one review at Rotten Tomatoes, not enough to give it an aggregated score. The review, which is from Common Sense Media, gives the film 3 out of 5 stars, and the disclaimer: "Wolves will scare younger kids in this holiday feature." However, it is implied that the film has received mostly mixed reviews by critics and audiences.

Home media
The film was released on DVD and Blu-ray in most European territories, and was released as a direct-to-video film in North America on DVD.

Soundtrack
The original score was composed by Stephen McKeon.

 Happy Christmas! – Performed by Vuokko Hovatta
 Flying Forces Rock – Written by Stephen McKeon
 The Way to the Stars – Written by Stephen McKeon, performed by Sean Dexter

Sequel
The sequel, Little Brother, Big Trouble: A Christmas Adventure was first released on 12 October 2012 in Finland. The sequel follows Niko, who must deal with his mother getting remarried and gaining a stepbrother named Jonni. When Jonni is kidnapped by eagles, Niko flies off to rescue him. He is joined by an old, near-blind reindeer named Tobias, the former leader of the Flying Forces. But also standing in Niko's way is White Wolf, Black Wolf's sister, who leads the eagles and wants revenge on Niko for her brother's death.

See also
 List of Christmas films
 The Magic Crystal (2011 film)

References

External links
Official website 

2008 3D films
2008 films
2000s adventure films
2008 computer-animated films
2000s children's animated films
2000s Christmas films
2008 television specials
Christmas television specials
Animated Christmas television specials
2000s animated television specials
Finnish Christmas films
3D animated films
2000s Finnish-language films
CBS television specials
Finnish animated films
Santa Claus in film
Animated films about wolves
Santa Claus's reindeer
Films about deer and moose
Avalanches in film